The InfoMedia Albania Awards (often shortened to IMA Awards) is an Albanian and Kosovo television awards ceremony, initiated in 2011 by InfoMedia Albania. The InfoMedia Albania Awards are the most prominent ceremony for which the results are voted on by the general public.

The first ceremony was held in 2011 by voting at InfoMedia Albania Facebook FanPage. From 2014 onwards the voting process was held in InfoMedia Albania official site.

Voting process
The public vote is an online poll that takes place on the InfoMedia Albania website; viewers can select from a longlist of nominees, with the process verified by an independent adjudicator. The results are widely reported in the Albanian and Kosovo media with worldwide media coverage of some categories.

Editions

1st edition

2nd edition

3rd edition

Albanian Televisions Awards

References

External links
Official website

Award ceremonies